James Robert Anthony Adams (born James Robert Choke) is the main character in the first series of the acclaimed book series CHERUB by British author Robert Muchamore. Upon joining CHERUB he changed his surname to Adams, which is derived from ex-Arsenal FC defender Tony Adams. He ended his CHERUB career wearing a black T-shirt, which is the most elite colour granted. At the end of his CHERUB life, he returns to his "Choke" surname and switches his two forenames around, to become Robert James Choke. However, he is still referred to as James in later books. He made an appearance in the third book of the second CHERUB series, Black Friday and is a mission controller in the fourth book of the second CHERUB series,  Lone Wolf. He also made an appearance in the last book, New Guard.

Early life
James was born under the name James Robert Choke in Tufnell Park, London on October 27, 1991. He lived with his half-sister Lauren and his mother, Gwen Choke, who ran the largest shoplifting empire in North London from an armchair in their living room. James didn't know who his father was, though it is revealed in a deleted chapter from Divine Madness (as well as at the end of the book Shadow Wave) that he was a mathematics professor.

When James was two years old, his mother gave birth to his half-sister Lauren Zoe Onions (later known as Lauren Adams, taking on the same crypto-surname as her brother). His mother married Lauren's father, Ronald 'Ron' Onions, who was verbally and physically abusive towards James. He is described in The Recruit as being like "a loud, smelly rug". However, Ron does not live with them and only visits when he wants money from Gwen.

Early in the first book, their mother passes away because of a mix of alcohol and pain medication. This results in Lauren living with her father and James staying in a children's home called Nebraska House, because Ron didn't want him.

CHERUB life and missions
In The Recruit, James begins his CHERUB career. After returning from basic training, he discovers his sister Lauren has also been recruited following the arrest of her father Ron Onions on various charges (including possession of drugs and stolen artefacts, and abusing a minor).

James arrives at CHERUB the night after his twelfth birthday and, after learning how to swim under the guidance of Amy Collins, immediately enters Basic Training. He is paired with eleven-year-old Kerry Chang, who has lived at CHERUB since age seven and whose parents died when she was three (when she was placed in a succession of children's homes). Kerry assists James with her well-honed skills and sheer determination, whilst in return, she asks him to help protect her injured knee. Throughout basic training he develops a strong bond with Kerry as well as the six other recruits, Shakeel Dajani, Mo, Gabrielle O'Brien, Callum Reilly, Connor Reilly and Nicole Eddison.

First mission

James' first mission was with Amy Collins at Fort Harmony, a Welsh 'hippy' camp, founded by a woman named Gladys Dunn. CHERUB was called in to infiltrate and become close to brothers Fire and World Dunn as well as Brian 'Bungle' Evans, all of whom were suspected of being connected to an eco-terrorist organisation named 'Help Earth'. With an event named 'Petrocon' (the largest meeting of oil executives) occurring at nearby Green Brooke Conference Center, these three men were suspected of organising an attack against the meeting's attendees. James befriended Clark and Sebastian Dunn, two brothers frequently described as 'psycho', and developed a relationship with his first girlfriend, Joanna Ribble, despite the disapproval of her father. It was thought that Fire and World were transporting pieces of a bomb into the centre on mini remote controlled cars, but it is revealed that they were actually creating a bio-weapon made from anthrax. Upon the realisation that James had come into contact with safety clothing used to handle anthrax while investigating Fire and World's workshop, James was rushed to the hospital. It was revealed that the anthrax was a very weak strain (used to immunise Green Brooke staff), and James was completely healthy. Fire, World and Scargill were arrested, and Fort Harmony was eventually evacuated by police. James' mission controller was Ewart Asker, and James was awarded a navy shirt for his contribution to this mission. Being awarded a navy shirt after only one mission is a rare accomplishment in CHERUB.

Second mission

James goes on his second mission with Kerry Chang, Nicole Eddison and his best friend Kyle Blueman to Luton, North London. He befriends Junior Moore, the son of large-scale drug dealer Keith Moore. Kerry uncovers the factory where the company packages the drugs, with the help of James and Lauren, and James flies to Miami with Junior and Keith. There he is attacked by members of the drug cartel Lambayeke and escapes in a Land Rover after shooting and killing a man. In this mission, his mission controllers are husband and wife Ewart and Zara Asker.

Third mission

This mission takes place in "Arizona Max", the colloquial name for Arizona State's Maximum Security Prison. Accompanying James is experienced CHERUB agent David "Dave" Moss, known around campus as a "stud" because it is rumoured that he impregnated a girl on a mission. James has to complete the mission alone when Dave is extracted because of injuries attained in a fight, and successfully escapes with target Curtis Oxford. He joins up with sister and fellow CHERUB agent Lauren Adams. Curtis takes them to his father, Etienne, who leads them to Curtis' mother, Jane Oxford, a notorious criminal known to run a large-scale illegal gun business. James' mission controller is John Jones, an ex-MI5 agent who worked with the agents in Class A. After experiencing the amazing work the CHERUB agents did, John decides to change jobs and work for CHERUB full-time. Also working with James was American FBI agents Warren Reise (known as Scott Warren for the purposes of the mission), Theodore Monroe and Marvin Teller. For his role in the capture of Jane Oxford, James received the Intelligence Star.

Fourth mission

James' fourth mission is once again with David "Dave" Moss. This mission takes place after a small-time crook Leon Tarasov begins splashing around large amounts of money, and the local police would love to know where it has come from. Ex-CHERUB agent Millie Kenter, who is now a member of the Metropolitan Police, calls in CHERUB to help them investigate. It turns out that the death of a local teenager 18 months earlier leads them to the discovery that Leon and police officer Michael Patel, along with a few other accomplices, robbed a casino, and Michael Patel had killed the teenager by pushing him off a rooftop. The CHERUB team (including Lauren and Kerry on attachment from campus) set up a trap so that the suspects admitted their crimes in an argument with each other. Leon was sent to prison for twelve years while Michael was convicted for life. The mission controller was John Jones, with Chloe Blake as assistant mission controller.

Fifth mission

The fifth mission takes place in Brisbane, Australia with James' younger sister, Lauren, and an older agent, Dana Smith. They are accompanied by Abigail Sanders, a member of the Australian Secret Intelligence Service, posing as their mother. Their main objective is to infiltrate a religious cult named 'The Survivors', thought to have links with the Eco-Terrorist group Help Earth. After researching the cult and reading about brainwashing techniques, the agents are ashamed when they find themselves already hypnotised by the group after only their first meeting. This leads the agents to work better and stronger and after not long, James and Lauren are sent to "The Ark" a monstrosity built in the Outback, by the cult leader, Joel Regan. Here, they meet Rathbone "Rat" Regan, Joel Regan's youngest son. It is discovered that Susie Regan, Joel's latest wife, is indeed involved with the organization 'Help Earth' and is having an affair with Brian 'Bungle' Evans, a terrorist who escaped custody in James' first mission. Susie kills Joel and takes off with Brian, with Joel's money. The Australian force is sent in to raid and destroy the Ark, but after the death of Joel Regan, the Ark is under lock down and heavily armed, and shoots down a whole chopper full of soldiers. James, Rat, and Lauren, along with young children from the Ark, manage to escape through a sewage system, just in time, as the Ark explodes, killing fifty people instantly, of which half are thought to be children. Susie and Bungle are stopped and Dana also stops a tanker being exploded in Indonesia. The mission controller is once again, John Jones, and Chloe Blake is his assistant, although it is revealed at the end of the mission that she is being promoted to a mission controller. For her bravery and rescuing of the children who would otherwise have been killed, Lauren is awarded the black shirt, outranking her brother for the first time.

Sixth mission

James' sixth mission is to bring down the Animal Freedom Militia, a terrorist group campaigning for animal rights. Lauren and Kyle join him, and Zara Asker is mission controller, one of her last times in the role before becoming chairwoman. James and Kyle are recruited by the Animal Freedom Army, a new animal rights group that plans on coming into recognition with a bang. They kidnap celebrity chef Nick Cobb and feed him his own cleaning product, which had previously been fed to rabbits as part of a lawsuit. This was broadcast live, over the internet. Kyle saves Nick and rushes him to hospital, and he survives.

Seventh mission

James' seventh mission based in Aero City, Russia. He joined two MI5 agents when the Intelligence minister declares that their mission is progressing too slowly, and that a CHERUB agent might speed up progress. The operation, however, goes disastrously wrong when two agents working with James murder their prime suspect, Denis Obidin, and James is trapped within Aero City. James is unable to contact campus and when he attempts to steal a phone he is beaten by a group of skateboarders. The skateboarders, having heard of a reward offered for James' capture, call the hotline and within a few minutes one of Obidin's men arrives, pays the skateboarders and arrests James. The henchman reveals himself to be an undercover CIA agent. After treating James to the best of his ability, he challenges him as to why he was there and why Obidin was killed. When James protests that their intentions were peaceful, he is shown CCTV footage of the murder. The agent lets James call CHERUB campus before he leaves, telling him not to go to sleep at any cost.

Mission controller Ewart Asker arrives and takes James to an airfield where two British service people are to help with their escape. The Russian authorities appear, though, and they are forced to take the couple with them. On the flight, James passes out when air trapped in his broken nose expands due to air pressure changes and the pilot ends up making an emergency landing in Helsinki, Finland.
When James finally makes it back to CHERUB, he is awarded his black shirt by Zara for his bravery in saving Ewart, even though the mission was a failure.

Eighth mission

Following the collapse of KMG (Keith Moore's Gang) at the end of James' Second mission, rival drug gangs the Mad Dogs and the Slasher Boys engage in a violent turf war for control of the Luton underworld. CHERUB agents Gabrielle O'Brien and Michael Hendry are sent to infiltrate the Slasher Boys. While carrying out a delivery for Major Dee, the leader of the Slasher Boys, Gabrielle's contact is killed by members of rival gang the Runts and Gabrielle is grievously wounded after being stabbed by a Runt.

Gabrielle barely survives her injury and the CHERUB Ethics Committee think of calling off the mission but are persuaded to send James and Bruce to infiltrate the Mad Dogs. Zara Asker takes over the overall running of the mission, while Chloe Blake continues running the everyday aspects. James uses his past relationship with Keith Moore's son and Mad Dog associate Junior Moore to make infiltrating the gang easier. He is soon accepted into the gang. An older gang member, David "Wheels" Kemp, invites James on a hotel robbery. However, James being given a high role annoys Junior, who Mad Dogs leader Sasha Thompson is trying to protect. Junior tries to persuade James to join him in the robbery of a travel agent, but James declines. Junior successfully robs the travel agent but is arrested moments after.

Sasha plans a great drug robbery on Major Dee. They get into an apartment. Some gang members are by pretending the people need to fill in a form. They then Taser the woman who opens the door, before capturing nearly all the people inside with the use of handcuffs and rubber gags. James decides to help a young boy found inside who is not treated well, and one of the cocaine dealers is freed so he can continue dealing and avoid suspicion. The gang then soon leaves not long after. James, though reluctant, loses his virginity to Sasha's daughter Lois, who suddenly meets him when he is having a bath. James tells his girlfriend Dana although hurt, forgives him. Afterwards, James, Bruce and Michael successfully complete their mission and Bruce earns a black shirt.

Ninth mission

James' ninth mission is to investigate the anarchist group SAG (Street Action Group). He takes part in a mass riot organized by SAG's leader, Chris Bradford. He later acts as Bradford's bodyguard during a meeting with gun supplier 
Rich Davis, and successfully plants a surveillance device. The mission ends unexpectedly when police arrive and arrest everyone, as a result of the anti-terrorist unit investigating Rich Davis.

Tenth mission

James' tenth and final CHERUB mission is to infiltrate the South Devon branch of Brigands M.C., to gather intelligence on the branch's weapons-dealing business. He eventually becomes a member of the club, and goes along to a weapons deal with the club's leader, Ralph "Führer" Donnington, where they are ambushed by the police. Donnington attempts to escape but breaks his leg on the side of a cliff, and has to be helicoptered off by police.

Post-CHERUB career 
After leaving CHERUB, James graduates from Stanford University and works as a mission controller at CHERUB. In New Guard, he leads an off-the-books mission with four other ex-CHERUBs to rescue two kidnapped oil well technicians from the Islamic State.

Physical appearance
He has been known to acquire weight easily, due to his tendency to not care about what he is eating. James easily gets girlfriends on missions and on campus due to his good looks and tendency to get off with every girl he sees.

Academic
James has an IQ of 152, and his prowess at maths is commonly noted, with him taking his A-levels in maths and further maths a year earlier than normal and teaching maths to younger members of CHERUB (in a deleted chapter from The Recruit). He is fluent in Russian (but hasn't mastered the accent) and Spanish. He is also good at physics and got a guaranteed pass at GCSE for history in The Fall (when he helped Kevin Sumner combat his fear of heights), but James is known for messing around in lessons when he should be paying attention. It is also known that James got kicked out of many schools before he arrived at Cherub, due to his lack of respect.

References

Characters in young adult book series
Characters in British novels of the 21st century
Literary characters introduced in 2004
Fictional British secret agents
Fictional judoka
Fictional karateka
CHERUB characters